Dark Shadows: The Ghost Watcher is a Big Finish Productions original dramatic reading based on the long-running American horror soap opera series Dark Shadows.

Plot 
Maggie Evans has recovered from her ordeals and is ready to build a new life for herself, but then she meets the mysterious Ghost Watcher...

Cast
Maggie Evans – Kathryn Leigh Scott
Nathan Hawkins – Alec Newman

External links
Dark Shadows - The Ghost Watcher

Dark Shadows audio plays
2008 audio plays